Henry Dumas (July 20, 1934 – May 23, 1968) was an American writer and poet. He has been called "an absolute genius" by Toni Morrison, who as a commissioning editor at Random House published posthumous collections both of his poetry, Play Ebony, Play Ivory, and his short stories, Ark of Bones, in 1974.

Biography

Dumas was born in Sweet Home, Arkansas, in 1934 and lived there until the age of ten, when he moved to New York City; however, he always kept with him the religious and folk traditions of his hometown. In Harlem, he attended public school and graduated from Commerce High School in 1953. After graduating, he attended City College of New York, before joining the Air Force. But prior to beginning his military journey, he met a woman named Loretta Ponton in New York. The two would keep in touch, marrying in 1955 and moving to Lackland Air Force Base in San Antonio, Texas. Dumas also spent eighteen months on the Arabian Peninsula, where he developed an interest in Arab culture. He was in the military until 1957, at which time he enrolled at Rutgers University, where he attended as a full-time and a part-time student without attaining a degree. Dumas and Ponton had two sons, David, born in 1958, and Michael, born in 1962.

In 1967, Dumas became a teacher-counselor and director of language workshops at Southern Illinois University's Experiment in Higher Education, in East St. Louis. He worked there under the direction of Dr. Edward W. Crosby, who was also an editor of the Hiram Poetry Review at the time. Some of Dumas's early work was published in the Hiram Review, which is likely how the two became acquainted. Dumas also became an editor of the Hiram Review from 1967 until his death in 1968. After Dumas's untimely death Dr. Crosby returned to the editorial staff of the Hiram Review and urged Eugene Redmond, one of Dumas's fellow teachers and poet, to talk to Loretta Dumas about publishing his works posthumously. The die was cast, arrangements were made and with the editorial assistance of Hale Chatfield, founder of the Hiram Poetry Review, Dumas's works were published by SIU Press.

Death 
On May 23, 1968, at approximately 12:15 a.m., Dumas was shot to death at the age of 33 by a New York City Transit Police officer on the southbound platform of the 125th Street/Lenox Avenue station of the New York City Subway. According to the Associated Press report, the officer claimed that Dumas had been threatening another man with a knife. The officer said that he ordered Dumas to drop the knife, but that Dumas instead turned, attacked the officer, and slashed the officer's cheek. The officer stated that he fired three times.

The circumstances of the shooting remain unclear as no witnesses testified and no records remain since the Transit Police Department's records of the shooting were destroyed when the agency merged into the New York City Police Department in 1995. Dumas's death is often called "a case of mistaken identity".

Dumas was buried in Long Island National Cemetery in Suffolk County, New York. His death is mentioned in the poem "An Alphabet of My Dead," by Poet Laureate Robert Pinsky, as well as the poem "Night, for Henry Dumas" by Aracelis Girmay.

Posthumous recognition 
A limited amount of Dumas's work was published during his lifetime in several small magazines and journals in the 1960s. It was mainly through the efforts of Eugene B. Redmond, the executor of Dumas's literary estate, that various collections of his work have been published. Poetry for My People was first published in 1970 by Southern Illinois University Press, where Dumas worked before his death. Toni Morrison, then working as an editor at Random House, read Poetry for My People and used her influence to have Random House publish two collections of Dumas's published and unpublished writings in 1974, Play Ebony, Play Ivory, which was a reprint of Poetry for my People, and Ark of Bones. To generate interest in Dumas, Morrison hosted a book launch party on October 13, 1974. In her invitation, Morrison said of Dumas's work that it was "some of the most beautiful, moving, and profound poetry and fiction that I have ever in my life read." When Play Ebony, Play Ivory appeared in 1974, Julius Lester, writing in The New York Times Book Review, called Dumas "the most original Afro-American poet of the sixties."

In 1976, Dumas's short story "Thalia" was awarded the Black Scholar's literary award by James Baldwin. Poet Eugene Redmond, Dumas's literary executor and editor, helped renew interest in Dumas in 1988 with the publication of the short story anthology, Goodbye Sweetwater, which contained both previously published and new works. Redmond released a second anthology, Knees of a Natural Man, in 1989. In 2015, Redmond spoke of his hope that "the Black Lives Matter movement will help introduce Dumas to a whole new audience and help bolster the foundation that the moment rests upon."

Rapper Milo has referenced him in song multiple times, most notably in the song “Napping Under the Echo Tree” whose title is a reference to Dumas’ book “Echo Tree: the Collected Short Fiction of Henry Dumas”. He is also referenced by name in the song's lyrics.

Influences

Dumas described himself as having been heavily influenced by Moms Mabley and gospel music at a young age. Dumas used his spiritual upbringing as well as his other experiences as a black child growing up in the south during the 1930s and 1940s frequently in his writings.

Dumas had a strong interest in the music and folk elements that are strongly related to the black experience. In the 1960s, he became increasingly recognized as one of the most important voices of the Black Power Movement and its artistic manifestation, the Black Arts Movement, immersing himself in music, particularly gospel, spirituals, jazz, and blues. Dumas studied with jazz musician Sun Ra during the mid-1960s. Dumas's poem "Black Paladins" became the title track for a recording by Joseph Jarman and Famoudou Don Moye in 1979. Dumas often addresses other prevalent themes of the 1960s. In his poem "Afro American," he attempts to define not only, what it means to be black, but also of dual heritage and proposes the recognition of both a dual heritage and that of each of its creators.

Writer Margaret Walker and musicians James Brown and John Coltrane proved to be major influences on his writing. Elements of Black Christianity, Islam, Sufi mysticism, Hinduism, Buddhism, Native American mythology, and African mythology appear in Dumas's works.

Both his fiction and his poetry developed themes of the Black Arts, or Black Aesthetic movement.

Bibliography

Poetry for My People (1970) (poetry) 
Ark of Bones and Other Stories (1974) (short stories)
Play Ebony, Play Ivory (1974) (poetry)
Jonoah and the Green Stone (1976) (novel)
Rope of Wind and Other Stories (1979) (short stories)
Goodbye, Sweetwater: New and Selected Stories (1988) (short stories)
Knees of a Natural Man: The Selected Poetry of Henry Dumas (1989) (poetry)
Echo Tree: The Collected Short Fiction of Henry Dumas (Coffee House Press, 2003) (short stories)

References

Further reading
 Eugene B. Redmond, introduction to Ark of Bones' and Other Stories, 1974.
 Carolyn A. Mitchell, "Henry Dumas", in Dictionary of Literary Biography, vol. 41, Afro-American Poets since 1955, eds Trudier Harris and Thadious M. Davis, 1985, pp. 89–99.
 John A. Williams, "Henry Dumas: Black Word-Worker", in Black American Literature Forum Vol. 22, No. 2 (Summer 1988): 402–404.
 Eugene B. Redmond, "The Ancient and Recent Voices within Henry Dumas", introduction to Goodbye Sweetwater, 1988.
 Eugene B. Redmond, "Poet Henry Dumas: Distance Runner, Stabilizer, Distiller", introduction to Knees of a Natural Man: The Selected Poetry of Henry Dumas, 1989.
 Dana A. Williams, "Making the Bones Live Again: A Look at the 'Bones People' in August Wilson's Joe Turner's Come and Gone and Henry Dumas' Ark of Bones", College Language Association Journal 42: 3 (March 1999): 309–19.
 Jeffrey B. Leak, Visible Man: The Life of Henry Dumas , University of Georgia Press (2014),

External links
Modern American Poetry material
Poets.org – The Academy of American Poets

1934 births
1968 deaths
African-American poets
Poets from Arkansas
People from Pulaski County, Arkansas
Deaths by firearm in Manhattan
United States Air Force airmen
Rutgers University alumni
Southern Illinois University faculty
20th-century American poets
African-American short story writers
American male short story writers
20th-century American short story writers
African Americans shot dead by law enforcement officers in the United States
20th-century African-American writers
African-American male writers